Aksel Horgen (born 29 May 1996) is a Norwegian handball player for Bjerringbro-Silkeborg Håndbold and the Norwegian national team.

Individual awards
 All-Star Right Wing of Eliteserien: 2018/2019
 Best Player of Eliteserien: 2018/2019

Personal life
Is in a relationship with fellow handballer Henny Reistad.

References

External links

1996 births
Living people
Norwegian male handball players
Handball players from Oslo
Expatriate handball players
Norwegian expatriate sportspeople in Denmark